Conus boavistensis is a species of sea snail, a marine gastropod mollusk in the family Conidae, the cone snails and their allies.

Like all species within the genus Conus, these snails are predatory and venomous. They are capable of "stinging" humans, therefore live ones should be handled carefully or not at all.

Description
The size of an adult shell grows to a length of 13 mm to 20 mm.

Distribution
This species can be found in the Atlantic Ocean off the island of Boa Vista, Cape Verde.

References

 Rolán E. (1990) Descripcion de nuevas especies y subespecies del genero Conus (Mollusca, Neogastropoda) para el archipielago de Cabo Verde. Iberus Supplement 2: 5–70, 9 pls.
 Filmer R.M. (2001). A Catalogue of Nomenclature and Taxonomy in the Living Conidae 1758 - 1998. Backhuys Publishers, Leiden. 388pp
 Tucker J.K. (2009). Recent cone species database. 4 September 2009 Edition
 Cossignani T. & Fiadeiro R. (2017). Otto nuovi coni da Capo Verde. Malacologia Mostra Mondiale. 94: 26-36.page(s): 27

External links
  Puillandre N., Duda T.F., Meyer C., Olivera B.M. & Bouchet P. (2015). One, four or 100 genera? A new classification of the cone snails. Journal of Molluscan Studies. 81: 1–23
 
 Conus boavistensis at The Conus Biodiversity website
 Cone Shells – Knights of the Sea

boavistensis
Gastropods described in 1990
Fauna of Boa Vista, Cape Verde
Endemic fauna of Cape Verde
Gastropods of Cape Verde